Natronoflexus is an obligately anaerobic and alkaliphilic genus of bacteria from the family of Marinilabiliaceae with one known species (Natronoflexus pectinivorans). Natronoflexus pectinivorans has been isolated from sediments from a soda lake from Altai in Russia.

References

Bacteria genera
Bacteroidia
Monotypic bacteria genera